Shaggy Man is the name of several fictional characters appearing in comic books published by DC Comics.

Publication history
The Shaggy Man debuted in Justice League of America #45 (June 1966) and was created by writer Gardner Fox and artist Mike Sekowsky. That story also introduced a second Shaggy Man created to combat the first. The original Shaggy Man returned in Justice League of America #104 (Feb. 1973). The second character reappeared in a one-shot story in Justice League of America #186 (Jan. 1981). Then the original Shaggy Man reappeared in Crisis on Infinite Earths #9-10 (Dec. 1985-Jan. 1986).

Another version returned in JLA #24 - 26 (Dec. 1998 - Feb. 1999) and was updated and rechristened "the General" after General Wade Eiling transplanted his mind into it. The General reappeared in the "World War III" storyline JLA #36 - 41 (Dec. 1999 - May 2000).

A third Shaggy Man was created by Lex Luthor and debuted in Justice League of America Wedding Special (Nov. 2007), the first chapter of a storyline that continued in Justice League of America #13-15 (Nov. 2007 - Jan. 2008).

A fifth Shaggy Man, created by Professor Ivo, debuted in Justice League of America Vol. 3 #4. He later returned as a tool of Black Manta and N.E.M.O. in Aquaman: Rebirth #8-9 (2016).

Writer Mike Conroy noted that the Shaggy Man was "a mountainous cross between Frankenstein's monster and the Sasquatch".

Fictional character biographies

First Shaggy Man
The Shaggy Man is the creation of Professor Andrew Zagarian, a scientist who invented "plastalloy", a synthetic human tissue substitute, similar to plastic, that can be used for organ transplants. Professor Zagarian built the Shaggy Man by splicing his material with salamander DNA. As a result of a power surge, it transformed into an artificial lifeform resembling a hulking hairy human-shaped creature that can rapidly regenerate. Essentially mindless, the creature then attacked anything that moved. The Justice League attempted to stop the creature, but the Shaggy Man held them all off until the Flash suggests that Zagarian create a second creature to fight the first. The League then sealed the two monsters inside a deep pit, where they could battle each other indefinitely.

Shaggy Man is eventually freed by villain Hector Hammond and transported to the JLA satellite; Green Lantern uses his power ring to shrink the monster to miniature size and imprison it.

At the time when Professor Zagarian was imprisoned for causing the Shaggy Man incident, Shaggy Man went on a rampage in Arizona, Professor Zagarian was visited by Flash and informs him that Shaggy Man's powers are tied to photosynthesis. As this came from Shaggy Man's fur, the Justice League shaved off Shaggy Man's fur and stranded Shaggy Man on the Dark Side of the Moon.

At some point, Shaggy Man returned to Earth and was found to have been imprisoned in Atlantis by Aquaman during Green Lantern's visit to Atlantis. Shaggy Man's inert body is eventually recovered from the depths of the ocean by General Wade Eiling and his Ultramarine Corps. Eiling, diagnosed with an inoperable brain tumour, transfers his mind into the creature's body, shaves off the body hair, and refers to himself as "the General". After a battle with the JLA and the Ultramarines, the General is teleported into the Solar System's asteroid belt. Marooned in space, the General is eventually rescued by Lex Luthor's new Injustice League and they again battle the JLA. After a skirmish with Superman, Orion and the Martian Manhunter, the General falls into the "Ghost Zone", a void which the villain Prometheus uses as a hideout.

Second Shaggy Man
At Flash's suggestion, Professor Zagarian created a second Shaggy Man to fight the first Shaggy Man. The Justice League sealed both Shaggy Men in a pit where they could fight each other.

After getting free, Shaggy Man is later discovered to be rampaging across Russia and is finally tricked by Batman and, via a rocket, is sent into outer space.

Shaggy Man eventually returns during the "Crisis on Infinite Earths" storyline where he is among the villains united under Brainiac. When on Earth-X, Shaggy Man fought Mento and Changeling. He is apparently destroyed by Green Arrow of Earth-Two with an explosive arrow as Green Arrow observed that since Shaggy Man isn't really alive, he has no problem using such otherwise lethal methods.

Third Shaggy Man
A new version of Shaggy Man appears as a member of the Injustice League. Shaggy Man later joins Gorilla Grodd in assaulting the hero Geo-Force. Lex Luthor revealed that he created this Shaggy Man and states that he doesn't usually let it out except for when it's time for some exercising. Wonder Woman fought Shaggy Man during the fight against the Injustice League.

During the holiday season, Green Lantern and Red Arrow thwart Shaggy Man's rampage at a Christmas parade where Red Arrow shoots him with a tranquilizer arrow loaded with 1500CCs which only placed him in a docile state. Not wanting to hand Shaggy Man over to S.T.A.R. Labs, Green Lantern and Red Arrow drag the drugged Shaggy Man with them due to the fact that they are late for the Justice League's Christmas party. When Shaggy Man comes out of his daze, the Justice League prevent him from attacking by giving him a Christmas present in the form of a teddy bear that appeases Shaggy Man. To place the star on top of the Christmas tree, the Justice League give the job to Shaggy Man as they all sing "Auld Lang Syne".

Fourth Shaggy Man
During the "Brightest Day" storyline, Simon Stagg performed an unknown experiment that enabled Java to transform into a Shaggy Man. He only agreed to the experiment due to the fact that Java was still devastated at the death of Sapphire Stagg. Java's Shaggy Man form was defeated by Simon Stagg's former minion Freight Train who defected to the Outsiders.

Fifth Shaggy Man
In 2011, "The New 52" rebooted the DC universe. A Shaggy Man appeared as a member of the Secret Society of Super Villains. Created by Professor Ivo, this version battled the Justice League of America and helped capture them upon their defeat. After it was revealed that Catwoman was actually Martian Manhunter in disguise, Shaggy Man fought the Justice League of America when they infiltrated the Secret Society of Super Villains' mansion where he was defeated by Stargirl.

In 2016, DC Comics implemented another relaunch of its books called "DC Rebirth" which restored its continuity to a form much as it was prior to "The New 52". This Shaggy Man reappears as a pawn of villain Black Manta. After a brutal battle, Aquaman finally defeats the creature by attaching his Justice League membership card to the Shaggy Man and ordering the Justice League satellite to transport it beyond Earth's orbit.

Powers and abilities
The Shaggy Man is super strong and impervious to physical harm. In courtesy of retro-engineering with salamander DNA, the creature can regenerate itself almost spontaneously and does not need sustenance or rest. Thanks to its synthetic physiology, the monster could adapt in harsh environments (such as both outer space and underwater). It was able to smell the adrenaline from its opponent's sweat. As a bio-organic lifeform, it no longer ages. Its mindlessness can be a disadvantage.

Professor Ivo's Shaggy Man has adaptation abilities as seen when he developed fire-breathing abilities when fighting Martian Manhunter.

Other versions
In DC Super Friends #20, "A Hair Raising Tale", Dr. Andrew Zagarian creates the Shaggy Man, but he immediately breaks free from the lab and goes on a rampage. The Super Friends try to fight him, but find they are no match for his strength and resilience, not even Superman. Woman Woman then realizes that the Shaggy Man is essentially a newborn who is lashing out, due to being frightened by his surroundings and constantly being attacked. She convinces the Shaggy Man to stand down by being nice to him. After letting the Shaggy Man enjoy a parade, the Super Friends send him to a wilderness area to live peacefully.

In other media
 Shaggy Man makes minor non-speaking appearances in Batman: The Brave and the Bold.
 Shaggy Man appears in the DC Super Hero Girls episode "#FightAtTheMuseum", voiced by Jason Spisak.

References 

Articles about multiple fictional characters
Characters created by Gardner Fox
Characters created by Mike Sekowsky
Comics characters introduced in 1966
DC Comics characters with accelerated healing
DC Comics characters with superhuman senses
DC Comics characters with superhuman strength
DC Comics hybrids
DC Comics supervillains
Fictional characters with immortality
Fictional characters with superhuman durability or invulnerability
Fictional genetically engineered characters
Fictional monsters